Hatsik (also Romanized as Hats’ik and Atsik; until 1963, Imeni Voroshilova, from 1963 to 1991, Nairi) is a town in the Armavir Province of Armenia. The town was founded in 1933. It was named in honor of Kliment Voroshilov, a Soviet politician, and later called Nairi from 1963 to 1991. Population is 2973.

See also 
Armavir Province

References 

World Gazeteer: Armenia – World-Gazetteer.com

Populated places in Armavir Province
Populated places established in 1933